Casimir Polemus is the name of a man supposedly involved in three separate shipwrecks, being the sole survivor of each. 

He was born in Ploërmel, France in the 19th century.

He sailed with the Jeanne Catherine, which was wrecked off Brest on July 11, 1875.
Five years later, he again sailed on the Trois Frères, which was wrecked in the Bay of Biscay on Sept 4, 1880.
Two years later, he again sailed on L'Odéon, which was wrecked off Newfoundland on Jan 1, 1882.

Ripley's Believe It or Not reported the legend, assuming that it was true.

References

Year of death missing
Sole survivors
Legendary French people
Year of birth missing
Shipwreck survivors